The 1884 Florida gubernatorial election was held on November 4, 1884. Democratic nominee Edward A. Perry defeated Republican nominee Frank W. Pope with 53.53% of the vote.

General election

Candidates

Democratic 

 Edward A. Perry

Republican 

 Frank W. Pope

Results

References 

Florida gubernatorial elections
1884 Florida elections
Florida